The following outline is provided as an overview of and topical guide to Istanbul:

Istanbul –

General reference 
 Pronunciation:  ,)
 Toponymy: Names of Istanbul
 Common English name(s): Istanbul
 Official English name(s): Istanbul
 Adjectival(s): Istanbulite
 Demonym(s): Istanbulite

Geography of Istanbul 

Geography of Istanbul
 Istanbul is:
 a city
 Population of Istanbul: 14,804,116 
 Area of Istanbul: 5,343.02 km2 (2,062.95 sq mi)

Location of Istanbul 

 Istanbul is situated within the following regions:
 Northern Hemisphere and Eastern Hemisphere
 Eurasia
 Western Asia (outline) 
 Greater Middle East
 Turkey (outline)
 Marmara Region
 Istanbul Province
 Time zone(s): 
 TRT (UTC+03)

Environment of Istanbul 

 Climate of Istanbul

Natural geographic features of Istanbul 

 Canals in Istanbul
 Istanbul Canal
 Hills in Istanbul
 Seven hills of Istanbul
Çamlıca Hill
 Sarayburnu
 Inlets in Istanbul
 Golden Horn
 Islands in Istanbul
 Princes' Islands
 Straits in Istanbul
 Bosporus

Areas of Istanbul 

Districts of Istanbul

Urban centers in Istanbul 

Urban centers in Istanbul

Neighbourhoods in Istanbul 

Neighbourhoods of Istanbul
 Fatih
 Galata

Locations in Istanbul 

 Tourist attractions in Istanbul
 Museums in Istanbul
 Pera Museum
 Shopping areas and markets
 Grand Bazaar
 World Heritage Sites in Istanbul
Historic Areas of Istanbul

Ancient monuments in Istanbul 

 Column of Constantine
 Column of Marcian
 Column of the Goths
 Forum of Constantine
 Forum of Theodosius
 Hippodrome of Constantinople
 Obelisk of Theodosius
 Serpent Column
 Walled Obelisk
 Milion
 Aqueduct of Valens
 Walls of Constantinople
 Golden Horn Wall
 Propontis Wall
 Sea Walls
 Theodosian Walls
 Walls of Blachernae
 Wall of Constantine
 Walls of Galata

Bridges in Istanbul 

 Atatürk Bridge
 Bosphorus Bridge
 Fatih Sultan Mehmet Bridge
 Fil Bridge
 Galata Bridge
 Golden Horn Metro Bridge
 Haliç Bridge
 Yavuz Sultan Selim Bridge

Cultural and exhibition centres in Istanbul 

 Atatürk Cultural Center
 Istanbul Congress Center
 Istanbul Lütfi Kırdar International Convention and Exhibition Center

Forts in Istanbul 

 Anadoluhisarı
 Rumelihisarı
 Yedikule Fortress
 Yoros Castle

Fountains in Istanbul 

 Fountain of Ahmed III
 Fountain of Ahmed III (Üsküdar)
 German Fountain
 Sultan Mahmut Fountain
 Tophane Fountain

Gates in Istanbul 
Gates of Istanbul
 Gate of Charisius
 Gate of the Spring
 Xylokerkos Gate

Lighthouses in Istanbul 

 Ahırkapı Feneri
 Anadolu Feneri
 Fenerbahçe Lighthouse
 Kadıköy İnciburnu Feneri
 Maiden's Tower
 Rumeli Feneri
 Şile Feneri
 Yeşilköy Feneri

Monuments and memorials in Istanbul 

 Aviation Martyrs' Monument
 Ilhan Selçuk and the Enlightenment Instigators of the Republic Monument
 Istanbul Armenian Genocide memorial
 Monument of Liberty
 Republic Monument

Museums and art galleries in Istanbul 

Museums in Istanbul
 Ahmet Hamdi Tanpınar Literature Museum Library
 Doğançay Museum
 Galatasaray Museum
 Great Palace Mosaic Museum
 İstanbul Archaeology Museums
 Istanbul Aviation Museum
 Istanbul Contemporary Art Museum
 Istanbul Military Museum
 İstanbul Modern
 Istanbul Naval Museum
 Istanbul Postal Museum
 İstanbul State Art and Sculpture Museum
 İstanbul Toy Museum
 Istanbul Zoology Museum
 Pera Museum
 Sakıp Sabancı Museum
 SantralIstanbul
 Turkish and Islamic Arts Museum

Palaces and pavilions in Istanbul 

Ottoman palaces in Istanbul
 Aynalıkavak Pavilion
 Beylerbeyi Palace
 Boukoleon Palace
 Cantemir Palace in Istanbul
 Dolmabahçe Palace
 Esma Sultan Mansion
 Hatice Sultan Mansion
 Ihlamur Pavilion
 Khedive's Palace
 Küçüksu Pavilion
 Maslak Pavilion
 Palace of Antiochos
 Palace of Blachernae
 Palace of the Porphyrogenitus
 Topkapı Palace
 Tiled Kiosk
 Yıldız Palace
 Malta Kiosk

Parks and gardens in Istanbul 

 Avcıkoru Nature Park
 Belgrad Forest
 Emirgan Park
 Fethi Paşa Korusu
 Gülhane Park
 Kartal Park
 Miniatürk
 Taksim Gezi Park
 Yıldız Park

Public squares in Istanbul 

 Beyazıt Square
 Taksim Square

Religious buildings in Istanbul 

Mosques in Istanbul
 Arap Mosque
 Bayezid II Mosque
 Blue Mosque
 Cathedral of the Holy Spirit
 Chora Church
 Church of St. Anthony of Padua
 Church of St. George of Samatya
 Church of Saint Menas of Samatya
 Eski Imaret Mosque
 Fatih Mosque, Istanbul
 Hagia Irene
 Hagia Sophia
 Hagia Triada Greek Orthodox Church
 Little Hagia Sophia
 Manastır Mosque
 Monastery of Stoudios
 New Mosque
 Nuruosmaniye Mosque
 Ortaköy Mosque
 Pammakaristos Church
 Rüstem Pasha Mosque
 St. George's Cathedral
 Süleymaniye Mosque
 Yavuz Selim Mosque
 Zeyrek Mosque

Secular buildings in Istanbul 

 Ağa hamamı
 Basilica Cistern
 Basketmakers' Kiosk
 Caferağa Medrese
 Çiçek Pasajı
 Diamond of Istanbul
 Florya Atatürk Marine Mansion
 Grand Post Office
 Istanbul Aquarium
 Istanbul Justice Palace
 Istanbul Sapphire
 Mısır Apartment
 Sabancı Center
 Süleymaniye Hamam
 World Trade Center Istanbul
 Zorlu Center

Streets in Istanbul 

 Abdi İpekçi Street
 Bağdat Avenue
 Bankalar Caddesi
 Barbaros Boulevard
 Büyükdere Avenue
 İstiklal Avenue
 Kennedy Avenue
 Soğukçeşme Sokağı

Theatres in Istanbul 

 Bahçeşehir Muhsin Ertuğrul Theatre
 Cemil Topuzlu Open-Air Theatre
 Istanbul City Theatres
 Kadıköy Haldun Taner Stage
 Naum Theatre
 Sabancı Performing Arts Center

Towers in Istanbul 

Towers in Istanbul
 Beyazıt Tower
 Çamlıca TRT Television Tower
 Çamlıca Tower
 Dolmabahçe Clock Tower
 Etfal Hospital Clock Tower
 Galata Tower
 Nusretiye Clock Tower
 Yıldız Clock Tower

Demographics of Istanbul 

Demographics of Istanbul

Government and politics of Istanbul 

Politics of Istanbul
 Mayor of Istanbul
 International relations of Istanbul
 Twin towns and sister cities of Istanbul

Law and order in Istanbul 

 Law enforcement in Istanbul
 Turkish National Police
Istanbul Chief of Police

History of Istanbul 

History of Istanbul

History of Istanbul, by period or event 

Timeline of Istanbul
 Prehistory and origin of Istanbul 
 Byzantium
 The history of the city proper begins when Greek settlers from Megara establish Byzantium on the European side of the Bosphorus (660 BC) 
 Byzantium officially becomes a part of the Roman Empire (73 AD)

 Constantinople
 Foundation of Constantinople (324)
 Constantinople is reinaugurated in 324 from ancient Byzantium by Emperor Constantine the Great, after whom it was named, and becomes the capital of the Roman Empire (11 May 330)
 Fall of Constantinople (1453)
 Mehmed the Conqueror captures Constantinople and declares it the new capital of the Ottoman Empire (29 May 1453)
 Constantinople during the Ottoman era (1453–1922)
 Suleiman the Magnificent's reign from 1520 to 1566 is a period of great artistic and architectural achievements
 Constantinople during World War I
 Occupation of Istanbul by Allied forces (13 November 1918 – 4 October 1923)
 Modern Istanbul (1923–present)
 Turkish forces enter the city in a ceremony which marks the 'Liberation Day of Istanbul' (6 October 1923)
 The capital is moved from Istanbul to Ankara (1923)
 The international name Constantinople remains in use until Turkey adapts the Latin alphabet (1928)

History of Istanbul, by subject 

 Battle of Constantinople (378)
 Istanbul pogrom

Culture of Istanbul 

Culture of Istanbul

Arts in Istanbul

Architecture of Istanbul 
Architecture of Istanbul
 Buildings in Istanbul
 Byzantine monuments in Istanbul
 Tallest buildings in Istanbul

Music of Istanbul 

 
 Music festivals and competitions in Istanbul
 Istanbul International Jazz Festival
 Istanbul International Music Festival
 Music schools in Istanbul
 Istanbul University State Conservatory
 Music venues in Istanbul
 Cemal Reşit Rey Concert Hall
 Süreyya Opera House
 Zorlu PSM
 Musical ensembles in Istanbul
 Borusan Istanbul Philharmonic Orchestra
 Istanbul State Symphony Orchestra
 Musicians from Istanbul
 Necil Kazım Akses
 Hasan Ferit Alnar
 Ulvi Cemal Erkin
 Songs about Istanbul
 Istanbul (Not Constantinople)

Visual arts of Istanbul 

Art in Istanbul
 Istanbul in art / Paintings of Istanbul 
 Public art in Istanbul
 Akdeniz
 The Feeler
 Statue of Peace
Cuisine of Istanbul
 Baklava
Events in Istanbul
 Istanbul Biennial
Festivals in Istanbul
 International Istanbul Film Festival
Languages of Istanbul
 Turkish
 Greek
 Armenian
 Albanian
Media in Istanbul
 Newspapers in Istanbul
Hürriyet
Posta
 Radio and television in Istanbul
 Turkish Radio and Television Corporation
People from Istanbul
 Cornelius Castoriadis
 Bülent Ecevit
 Recep Tayyip Erdoğan
 Fahri Korutürk
 Mike Lazaridis
 Orhan Pamuk
 Nicola Rossi-Lemeni

Religion in Istanbul 
Religion in Istanbul

Sports in Istanbul 

Sports in Istanbul
 Football in Istanbul
 Association football in Istanbul
Süper Lig
Beşiktaş J.K.
İstanbul Başakşehir F.K.
 Basketball in Istanbul
 Basketball Super League
Anadolu Efes S.K.
Fenerbahçe Basketball
 Sports events in Istanbul
 Bosphorus Cup (figure skating) 
 Istanbul Marathon
 Istanbul Open
 Sports venues in Istanbul
 Ataköy Athletics Arena
 Atatürk Olympic Stadium
 BJK Akatlar Arena
 Istanbul Park
 Nef Stadium
 Şükrü Saracoğlu Stadium
 Ülker Sports and Event Hall
 Veliefendi Race Course
 Vodafone Park

Economy and infrastructure of Istanbul 

Economy of Istanbul
 Business districts in Istanbul
 Levent
 Maslak
 Companies in Istanbul
 Goldaş
 Koç Holding
 Petrol Ofisi
 Financial services in Istanbul
 Akbank
 Borsa Istanbul
 Hotels and resorts in Istanbul
 Çırağan Palace
 Divan Istanbul
 Hilton Istanbul Bosphorus
 Hotel Yeşil Ev
 Istanbul 4th Vakıf Han
 Pera Palace Hotel
 Raffles Istanbul
 Restaurants and cafés in Istanbul
 Changa
 Hünkar
 Ismet Baba Fish Restaurant
 Mikla
 Shopping malls and markets in Istanbul
 Shopping malls in Istanbul
 Grand Bazaar
 Mahmutpasha Bazaar
 Spice Bazaar
 Tourism in Istanbul
 Tourist attractions in Istanbul
Grand Bazaar
Historic Areas of Istanbul
 Utilities in Istanbul
 Silahtarağa Power Station
 Water supply and sanitation in Istanbul

Transportation in Istanbul 

Public transport in Istanbul
 Air transport in Istanbul
 Airports in Istanbul
 Atatürk Airport
 Istanbul Airport 
 Istanbul Sabiha Gökçen International Airport
 Cable transport in Istanbul
 Eyüp Gondola
 Maçka Gondola
 Maritime transport in Istanbul
 Ferries in Istanbul
Ferry quays in İstanbul
 Port of Istanbul
 Port of Haydarpaşa
 Road transport in Istanbul
 Busses in Istanbul
 Metrobus
 Roads in Istanbul
Otoyol 1
Otoyol 2
 Tunnels
 Eurasia Tunnel
 Great Istanbul Tunnel
 Marmaray Tunnel

Rail transport in Istanbul 

 Commuter rail lines
Marmaray
  Istanbul Metro
 Lines

 
 (under construction)

 (under construction)
 (under construction)
 (under construction)
 (line on hold)
Stations
 Funicular railway
 F1 Taksim–Kabataş funicular line
 F2 Tünel
 F3 Vadistanbul-Seyrantepe funicular line
 F4 Boğaziçi Üni./Hisarüstü–Aşiyan funicular line
 Railway stations in Istanbul
 Haydarpaşa railway station
 Sirkeci railway station
 Trams in Istanbul
 Istanbul nostalgic tramways
 Istanbul Tram
T1 (Istanbul Tram)
T4 (Istanbul Tram)
T5 (Istanbul Tram)

Education in Istanbul 

Education in Istanbul
 Libraries in Istanbul
 Universities and colleges in Istanbul
 Boğaziçi University
 Istanbul Technical University
 Istanbul University
 Marmara University

Healthcare in Istanbul 

 Hospitals in Istanbul
 Acıbadem Hospital
 Bakırköy Psychiatric Hospital
 Balıklı Greek Hospital
 Istanbul Italian Hospital  
 Surp Agop Hospital
 Surp Pırgiç Armenian Hospital
 Taksim German Hospital

See also 

 Outline of geography

References

External links 

Istanbul
Istanbul